Montgrí, Medes Islands and Baix Ter Natural Park is a natural park located in the province of Girona, Catalonia, Spain. It stretches over the municipalities of L'Escala, Torroella de Montgrí, Pals, Bellcaire d'Empordà, Palau-sator, Ullà, Fontanilles and Gualta.

References

External links
 
Map of the natural park
 Camping Lodge Neus is the only campsite situated in the heart of the Natural Park

Province of Girona
Natural parks of Catalonia
Protected areas established in 2010